Stipe Matić (born 6 February 1979) is a Croatian retired football player who last played for Swiss club Vevey Sports 05.

Club career
Matić began his playing career in the Croatian Prva HNL with Hajduk Split.

He played for Swiss sides FC Zürich, Wil, Thun, Naters and Vevey and after retiring as a player returned to FC Thun in 2017 to take charge of their U-16 team.

References

External links
 
 
 Profile at Hrvatska nogometna liga website

1979 births
Living people
Place of birth missing (living people)
Association football defenders
Croatian footballers
HNK Hajduk Split players
Vasas SC players
HŠK Posušje players
FC Zürich players
Hapoel Be'er Sheva F.C. players
Górnik Zabrze players
FC Wil players
FC Thun players
FC Naters players
FC Vevey United players
Croatian Football League players
Nemzeti Bajnokság I players
Premier League of Bosnia and Herzegovina players
Swiss Super League players
Israeli Premier League players
Ekstraklasa players
Swiss Challenge League players
Croatian expatriate footballers
Expatriate footballers in Hungary
Croatian expatriate sportspeople in Hungary
Expatriate footballers in Bosnia and Herzegovina
Croatian expatriate sportspeople in Bosnia and Herzegovina
Expatriate footballers in Israel
Croatian expatriate sportspeople in Israel
Expatriate footballers in Poland
Croatian expatriate sportspeople in Poland